Kazinczy Street Synagogue is an Art Nouveau orthodox synagogue built between 1912 and 1913 Budapest VII. district, 29-31 Kazinczy Street number. It is one of the most characteristic works of Hungarian synagogue architecture before the First World War.

History 
After the Jews of Pest split into three branches at the end of the 19th century, the idea of building an Orthodox synagogue in Elizabeth City came to mind in 1909. The site of Kazinczy Street, owned by the Pest Autonomous Orthodox Jewish Community, was designated as a suitable site for construction. On June 25, the same year, the elders of the community announced the application for the design of a complete building complex, which included, besides the synagogue, a community headquarters, a kindergarten, a school and a public kitchen. Among the entries received by the deadline of November 1, the jury selected the designs of József Porgesz and Sándor Skultetzky, Emil Ágoston, Sándor Löffler and Béla Löffler. At the end of the second round of the competition in April 1910, the committee recommended the work of Porgesz and Skultetzky to be carried out, but the community, in May overruled the decision, accepted the application of the Löffler brothers. 650,000 crowns were set aside for the construction costs, and the detailed design documentation of Sándor Löffler and Béla was approved on November 8, 1910. With this, construction began.

The first part of the building complex, the school and communal headquarters on the back of the plot, was completed in 1911 and handed over in 1912. Construction of the synagogue began in the spring of 1912, and after construction was delayed, and probably the budget was running out faster than expected, in July 1913 the Löffler brothers submitted a design change to a more ornate and less demanding main facade. The building was completed and the official commissioning permit was issued on September 29, 1913.

The Kazinczy Street Synagogue has become the religious-cultural center of the Orthodox branch of Pest Jewry. From 1928, the mikveh (ritual bath) functioned in the building until the blood-thirsty 1940s (it was only reopened in 2004). The building was located in the area of the Pest ghetto between 1944 and 1945 and was damaged by World War II and some of the equipment was destroyed. After 1945 the building complex was restored and the equipment was reconstructed. Over the following decades, the physical synagogue of the Great Synagogue deteriorated, first becoming unheated and then dangerous by the end of the 20th century. The Israeli community received the ground floor tract of ELTE's adjacent Teacher Training College. A small, modern house of worship, the Sas-Chevra Synagogue, was built here by Sándor Bokor, a community engineer. The Great Synagogue can be visited for an entrance fee.

The building 
The Löffler brothers' building designs were inspired by the Lechner Art Nouveau nationalist architecture of the post-World War I era, while also incorporating the formal influence of the late Viennese Art Nouveau. Elegant facades and sparingly decorated details add a dignity to the monumental block, which is architecturally state-of-the-art. The site designated for construction was rather narrow to carry out such a grandiose design, so the wing buildings flanking the main façade were terraced, so that the divided mass of the façade (approaching Rákóczi Street) seems to dominate and close Kazinczy Street.

Located on a two-story, patio-fronted main façade at four steps, the wrought-iron main gate with two smaller side entrances. Upstairs there are rectangular and semicircular windows with a rose window on top. The unity of the raw brick façade is sometimes broken by colorful artificial stone decoration. Above the travertine-covered ground floor, a double stone table was placed between the first-floor windows. The influence of the Viennese Art Nouveau on the stained-glass windows of David's star and menorah is illustrated. During the high-rise bidding, there is a two-line Hebrew quotation from the Old Testament throughout the facade ("What awe is this place: this is God's house and this gate of heaven", Gen 28:17).

Gallery

Sources 
P. Brestyánszky Ilona, Budapest zsinagógái, Budapest, Ciceró, 1999, 120–125.

External links
Great Orthodox (Kazinczy St.) Synagogue in the Bezalel Narkiss Index of Jewish Art, Center for Jewish Art, Hebrew University of Jerusalem

Synagogues in Budapest
Orthodox synagogues
Art Nouveau architecture in Budapest
Art Nouveau synagogues
Synagogues completed in 1913
1913 in Hungary